Bandai Golf Challenge Pebble Beach is a golf video game released for the Nintendo Entertainment System. It was developed and released by Bandai. The game is named after Pebble Beach, a golf course on California's Pacific Coast.

The game implements real world physics in addition to the traditional rules of golf, and consistently places players against the notoriously harsh winds of Pebble Beach. As with the game's real life counterpart, the Pacific Ocean plays a prominent role on the course and adds to the difficulty of play.

See also
 List of NES games

References

1989 video games
Bandai games
Golf video games
Nintendo Entertainment System games
Nintendo Entertainment System-only games
North America-exclusive video games
Tose (company) games
Video games developed in Japan
Video games set in California
Multiplayer and single-player video games